Muhammad Siddique Khan Baloch is a Pakistani politician who had been a member of the National Assembly of Pakistan from 2008 to October 2015 and a member of the Provincial Assembly of the Punjab from 1988 to 1993, from 1997 to 1999, and from August 2018 to January 2023.

Early life
He was born in 1959.

Political career
He was elected to the Provincial Assembly of the Punjab as a candidate of Islami Jamhoori Ittehad (IJI) from Constituency PP-171 (Multan-XII) in 1988 Pakistani general election. He received 15,410 votes and defeated an independent candidate, Amanullah Khan. He served as the Provincial Parliamentary Secretary of Punjab for Colonies and Agriculture Department from 1988 to 1990.

He was re-elected to the Provincial Assembly of Punjab as a candidate of IJI from Constituency PP-171 (Multan-XII) in 1990 Pakistani general election. He received 37,793 votes and defeated Amanullah Khan, a candidate of Pakistan Democratic Alliance.

He ran for the seat of the Provincial Assembly of Punjab as a candidate of Pakistan Muslim League (N) (PML-N) from Constituency PP-171 (Lodhran-I) in 1993 Pakistani general election. He received 33,417 votes and lost the seat to Amanullah Khan, a candidate of Pakistan Peoples Party (PPP).

He was re-elected to the Provincial Assembly of Punjab as a candidate of PML-N from PP-171 (Lodhran-I) in 1997 Pakistani general election. He received 48,604 votes and defeated Amanullah Khan, a candidate of PPP. During his tenure as Member of the Punjab Assembly, he served as Provincial Parliamentary Secretary of Punjab for Livestock and Dairy Development until 1999 Pakistani coup d'état.

He could not contest the 2002 Pakistani general election for being non-eligible due to graduation requirement.

He was elected to the National Assembly of Pakistan as a candidate of Pakistan Muslim League (Q) (PML-Q) from Constituency NA-154 (Lodhran-I) in 2008 Pakistani general election. He received 81,983 votes and defeated Mirza Muhammad Nasir Baig, a candidate of PPP.

He was re-elected to the National Assembly as independent candidate from Constituency NA-154 (Lodhran-I) in 2013 Pakistani general election. He joined PML-N after winning the election. In August 2015, he was unseated after he was declared disqualified to continue in office because of fake degree case. In October 2015, Supreme Court of Pakistan order by-polls in the constituency and allowed Baloch to contest. He received 86,177 votes and defeated Jahangir Khan Tareen. In the same election, he was re-elected to the Provincial Assembly of Punjab as an independent candidate from Constituency PP-210 (Lodhran-IV). He received 32,712 votes and defeated Rana Mohamamd Aslam Khan, a candidate of PML-N. In October 2015, he was disqualified as member of the National Assembly.

He ran for the seat of the National Assembly as a candidate of PML-N from Constituency NA-154 (Lodhran-I) in by-polls held in December 2015, but was unsuccessful by over 35,000 votes.

He was re-elected to Provincial Assembly of the Punjab as a candidate of PML-N from Constituency PP-227 (Lodhran-IV) in 2018 Pakistani general election.

References

Living people
Pakistan Muslim League (N) MPAs (Punjab)
Pakistani MNAs 2013–2018
Expelled members of the National Assembly of Pakistan
Pakistani MNAs 2008–2013
1959 births
Punjab MPAs 1988–1990
Punjab MPAs 1990–1993
Punjab MPAs 1997–1999
Punjab MPAs 2018–2023